The 1978 Kentucky Derby was the 104th running of the Kentucky Derby.  Affirmed, under jockey Steve Cauthen, won the race by 1 1/2 lengths over Alydar.  Believe It finished 3rd, 1 1/4 lengths behind Alydar, and 30-1 longshot Darby Creek Road finished 4th.  Affirmed won the Triple Crown by defeating Alydar by decreasing margins in the Preakness Stakes and the Belmont Stakes.

11 horses competed in the race.  Alydar went into the race as a 6-5 favorite, despite Affirmed having won 4 of the 6 previous races between the two.  Affirmed went off at 9–5.  Sensitive Prince and Believe It were the only other horses to go off at less than 30–1, at 9-2 and 7-1 respectively.  Sensitive Prince and Affirmed, both frontrunners, were near the lead early in the race behind long shot Raymond Earl.  Sensitive Prince took the lead at the first turn, but Affirmed gained the lead at the second turn.  After attaining the lead, Affirmed held it for the remainder of the race except for a brief moment when Believe It led by a head.  Alydar charged from the outside down the stretch, and overtook Believe It, despite the two horses bumping, but Alydar could not overtake Affirmed.

Payout

The 104th Kentucky Derby Payout Schedule

Results

 * Steve Cauthen youngest to ever ride in the Kentucky Derby.
 ** Robert Baird oldest to ever ride in the Kentucky Derby.
 Winning Breeder: Harbor View Farm; (FL)

References

Kentucky Derby races
1978 in horse racing
1978 in American sports
Derby
Kentucky Derby